Syarhey is a Belarusian transcription of the masculine given name Sergey. Notable persons with the name include:

Syarhey Amelyanchuk (born 1980), Belarusian footballer
Syarhey Balanovich (born 1987), Belarusian professional footballer
Syarhey Chernik (born 1988), Belarusian professional footballer
Syarhey Haydukevich (born 1954), candidate in the 2006 elections for President of Belarus
Syarhey Herasimets (born 1965), Belarusian professional football coach and a former player
Syarhey Hihevich (born 1987), Belarusian professional footballer
Syarhey Hlyabko (born 1992), Belarusian professional football player
Syarhey Irha (born 1984), Belarusian professional footballer
Syarhey Kandratsyew (born 1990), Belarusian professional football player
Syarhey Kantsavy (born 1986), Belarusian professional footballer
Syarhey Karnilenka (born 1983), Belarusian professional footballer
Syarhey Kavalchuk (born 1978), Belarusian professional footballer
Syarhey Kavalyuk (born 1980), Belarusian professional footballer

Syarhey Kazeka (born 1986), Belarusian footballer (midfielder)
Syarhey Khaletski (born 1984), Belarusian professional football player
Syarhey Kislyak (born 1987), Belarusian professional footballer
Syarhey Koshal (born 1986), Belarusian professional footballer
Syarhey Kozak (born 1981), Belarusian footballer
Syarhey Krot (born 1980), Belarusian professional footballer
Syarhey Kryvets (born 1986), Belarusian football player (midfielder)
Syarhey Kurhanski (born 1986), Belarusian professional football player
Syarhey Kuzminich (born 1977), Belarusian professional footballer
Syarhey Kuznyatsow (born 1979), Belorussian footballer
Syarhey Lyavitski (born 1990), Belarusian professional footballer
Syarhey Martynau, Belarusian politician, Minister for Foreign Affairs of Belarus from 2004 to 2012
Syarhey Matsveychyk (born 1988), Belarusian professional footballer
Syarhey Nikiforenka (born 1978), Belarusian footballer
Syarhey Palitsevich (born 1990), Belarusian professional football player
Syarhey Pawlyukovich (born 1974), Belarusian professional footballer
Syarhey Sakharuk (born 1982), Belarusian professional footballer
Syarhey Sasnowski (born 1981), Belarusian footballer (defender)
Syarhey Shchehrykovich (born 1990), Belarusian professional football player
Syarhey Shtanyuk (born 1973), Belarusian footballer
Syarhey Sidorski (born 1954), Prime Minister of Belarus from 10 July 2003 to 28 December 2010
Syarhey Sinevich (born 1989), Belarusian professional footballer
Syarhey Vyeramko (born 1982), Belarusian footballer (goalkeeper)
Syarhey Yaskovich (born 1972), Belarusian professional footballer

See also 

 Siarhei/Syarhei